Alejandro Reglero Vaz, known professionally as Alejandro Montaner, is a Venezuelan singer and the son of Ricardo Montaner. Montaner released in 2001 his debut album titled Todo Lo Que Tengo and two of its singles reached the Billboard Latin Songs chart, "Voy a Volverte Loca" (#10) and "Dímelo" (#18). In 2003, at the 15th Lo Nuestro Awards, he was nominated for Pop New Artist of the Year.

References

Living people
Latin pop singers
Date of birth missing (living people)
Place of birth missing (living people)
Year of birth missing (living people)